Matthew Dean Krueger (born 1978) is an American lawyer. He served as the United States Attorney for the Eastern District of Wisconsin from 2018 to 2021. He was previously an Assistant United States Attorney for the same district. Krueger worked at the U.S. Attorney's office from 2013 to 2018. He was previously an associate at Sidley Austin and a Bristow Fellow in the United States Department of Justice, Office of the Solicitor General. Krueger clerked for Paul V. Niemeyer of the United States Court of Appeals for the Fourth Circuit. He is a graduate of the University of Wisconsin–Madison and the University of Minnesota Law School, where he served as editor-in-chief of the Minnesota Law Review. On February 15, 2018, his nomination to be the United States Attorney was confirmed by voice vote. He was sworn in on February 22, 2018. On February 8, 2021, he along with 55 other Trump-era attorneys were asked to resign. On February 11, he announced his resignation, effective February 20, 2021.

References

External links
 Biography at U.S. Department of Justice

1978 births
Living people
Assistant United States Attorneys
Lawyers from Milwaukee
United States Attorneys for the Eastern District of Wisconsin
University of Wisconsin–Madison alumni
University of Minnesota Law School alumni
Wisconsin lawyers
21st-century American lawyers
People associated with Sidley Austin